Stuart Nigel Lewis-Evans (20 April 1930 – 25 October 1958) was a British racing driver from England. He participated in 14 Formula One World Championship Grands Prix, debuting on 19 May 1957. He achieved two podiums, and scored a total of 16 championship points. He also achieved two pole positions.

Early life
Stuart Lewis-Evans was born in Luton, Bedfordshire, but largely grew up in Kent, where his father, Lewis "Pop" Lewis-Evans, owned and ran a garage business. Pop Lewis-Evans had previously been a mechanic for the well-known racing driver Earl Howe, but had not previously raced himself. On leaving school, Lewis-Evans was apprenticed for three years to Vauxhall Motors, back in Bedfordshire, before he was called up for National Service. During this time he served as a motorcycle despatch rider for the Royal Corps of Signals.

Career
Lewis-Evans began racing in 1951 with a Cooper 500 Formula 3 car, encouraged by and sometimes racing against his father. He achieved many wins and podia and continued to race in 500s until 1956.

In 1957, he won the 1957 Glover Trophy, run to Formula One rules at Goodwood. In his first championship Formula One race, the 1957 Monaco Grand Prix, Lewis-Evans finished fourth in an inferior Connaught Type B, beaten only by multiple winners Fangio and Brooks, and Masten Gregory in one of the dominant Maserati 250F cars. This performance brought him to the attention of Tony Vandervell, owner of the rising Vanwall team, and by the next Grand Prix Lewis-Evans was driving the third Vanwall. The 1957 Vanwall was fast when its engine held together, but not always reliable. Lewis-Evans achieved his best finish for Vanwall when he was 2nd at the year's non-championship Moroccan Grand Prix. He took pole position at the final World Championship event, the Italian Grand Prix, but had to retire with engine problems.

The 1958 Formula One season would prove to be a much better year, at least initially, for the entire Vanwall team. Principal drivers Stirling Moss and Tony Brooks took three victories each, and Lewis-Evans added to the team's points haul with podium finishes in the Belgian and Portuguese events. He also took pole position at the Dutch Grand Prix, but failed to finish in the race. This was not his only retirement of the year – indeed his only other finish, although points-scoring, was a fourth place at the British Grand Prix.

Lewis-Evans crashed heavily at the dusty Ain-Diab Circuit during the season-ending Moroccan Grand Prix. His Vanwall's engine seized and sent him lurching into barriers at high speed, and his car burst into flames. He was airlifted back to the UK, but died in hospital of his burns six days after the accident. His death cast a pall over Vanwall's victory in the 1958 International Cup for F1 Manufacturers, an achievement to which Lewis-Evans had contributed significantly. Vandervell never fully recovered from Lewis-Evans's death and withdrew from motorsport at the end of 1958.

Racing record

Complete Formula One World Championship results
(key; Grands Prix in bold indicate pole position)

Non-Championship Formula One results
(key)

See also 
 Bernie Ecclestone

References

External links
 The 500 Owners Association
 Story of Lewis-Evans's first Grand Prix at 8W
 Career synopsis at gpracing.net
 Gallery of images at f1-facts.com

1930 births
1958 deaths
Military personnel from Bedfordshire
English racing drivers
British Formula Three Championship drivers
Brighton Speed Trials people
English Formula One drivers
Connaught Formula One drivers
Vanwall Formula One drivers
Sportspeople from Luton
Racing drivers who died while racing
Sport deaths in England
24 Hours of Le Mans drivers
World Sportscar Championship drivers
20th-century British Army personnel
Royal Corps of Signals soldiers